Volcano Choir is an American indie rock band from Wisconsin, formed in 2005. It has released two albums, Unmap and Repave.

History
The band began as a collaboration between Bon Iver's Justin Vernon and members of Collections of Colonies of Bees. Their debut album, Unmap, was released on September 22, 2009, reaching number 92 on the Billboard Top 200 chart. The band toured on the success of this release, with a large string of shows around Japan in November 2010 being their most notable run.

Since the band's formation, Jon Mueller (Death Blues) and Thomas Wincek (of All Tiny Creatures) have left Collections of Colonies of Bees, but continue to be members of Volcano Choir. They have also added Matthew Skemp on bass, who also plays in All Tiny Creatures.

It was revealed in a 2014 interview with band members that the name "Volcano Choir" originated from a vaporizer called the "Volcano".

The cover art for Unmap was created by Adreienne DeBoer, and insert art was illustrated by Dave Godowsky.

Volcano Choir released their second studio album, Repave, on September 3, 2013, on Jagjaguwar. The album was recorded at Vernon's April Base studio in Eau Claire, Wisconsin.

Andrew Fitzpatrick from All Tiny Creatures became a touring member in 2013, supporting the album Repave and is now a member of the band. He then became a touring member of Bon Iver, supporting the album 22, A Million.

Thomas Wincek joined Field Report in 2014.

Volcano Choir's song "Byegone" was used in the 4th episode of the first season of The 100.

The band finished touring in support of Repave in November 2014, and have since been on hiatus as Vernon focuses on Bon Iver.

Discography

Albums

Singles 
 Island, Is (2009)
 Byegone (2013)
 Comrade (2013)

Other
Sound (2014)

References

External links

Jagjaguwar page

Ableton Live users
Indie rock musical groups from Wisconsin
Polyvinyl Record Co. artists
Jagjaguwar artists
Love Da Records artists